KIKC-FM (101.3 MHz) is a radio station broadcasting a country music format. Licensed to Forsyth, Montana, United States, the station is currently owned by The Marks Group.

History
The station began broadcasting in September 1980, airing a middle of the road (MOR) format, and was owned by Gold Won Radio Corporation. By 1985, the station had adopted a country music format. On April 1, 1986, the station's call sign was changed to KIKC-FM, and it began simulcasting the programming of AM 1250 KIKC. In 1987, the station was sold to NEPSK Inc., along with its AM sister station, for $252,500. In 1996, the stations were sold to Stephen Marks for $300,000. In June 2001, the simulcast ended when AM 1250 adopted an oldies format.

References

External links
KIKC AM/FM Online

IKC-FM
Country radio stations in the United States
Radio stations established in 1980
1980 establishments in Montana
Rosebud County, Montana